Trancapecho is a sandwich served in Cochabamba, Bolivia. It comes from a dish called "silpancho", which differs from the traditional silpancho. All ingredients, including the rice, join to a bread tortilla, also the typical preparation in this city. In Cochabamba, this sandwich is found in areas such as markets and areas near San Paul's Catholic University.

See also
 Bolivian cuisine
 List of sandwiches

References

Bolivian cuisine
Egg sandwiches